La Angostura may refer to:

 La Angostura, Santa Cruz, a town in Bolivia
 La Angostura Lake, Bolivia
 Angostura Dam (Mexico)
 Villa La Angostura, a village in Argentina

See also
 Angostura (disambiguation)